Marcelo Martini Labarthe (born 12 August 1984 in Porto Alegre), known as Marcelo Labarthe, is a Brazilian footballer who plays as an attacking midfielder.

Club career
Marcelo Labarthe previously played for the rivals Internacional and Grêmio.

He started in the youth categories of Internacional, known only by his first name, Marcelo. Inter's president at the time, Fernando Carvalho, suggested the change to only Labarthe, the surname of his French origins, because it could be more attractive for the European leagues, where the boy could get dual citizenship (in a similar case of his fellows from Inter's youth team, Rafael Sobis and Marcos Camozzato). When he went to the main team, he used his first name along with his last one, Marcelo Labarthe.

Honours
Internacional
Campeonato Gaúcho: 2004, 2005

Juventus-SC
Campeonato Catarinense Série C: 2014

References

External links

1984 births
Living people
Brazilian footballers
Brazilian people of French descent
Brazilian people of Italian descent
Campeonato Brasileiro Série A players
Campeonato Brasileiro Série C players
Campeonato Brasileiro Série D players
J2 League players
Super League Greece players
Primeira Liga players
Brazilian expatriate footballers
Brazilian expatriate sportspeople in Portugal
Brazilian expatriate sportspeople in Japan
Brazilian expatriate sportspeople in Greece
Expatriate footballers in Portugal
Expatriate footballers in Japan
Expatriate footballers in Greece
Sport Club Internacional players
Sporting CP footballers
S.C. Beira-Mar players
Vitória F.C. players
Grêmio Foot-Ball Porto Alegrense players
Ventforet Kofu players
Uberlândia Esporte Clube players
Sociedade Esportiva e Recreativa Caxias do Sul players
Esporte Clube São José players
Comercial Futebol Clube (Ribeirão Preto) players
Platanias F.C. players
Associação Atlética Aparecidense players
Associação Portuguesa de Desportos players
Association football midfielders
Footballers from Porto Alegre